The following is a list of episodes of Lizzie McGuire, a television comedy series created by Terri Minsky for Disney Channel. It aired from January 12, 2001, to February 14, 2004. The show was produced by Stan Rogow. The show's target demographic was preteen and teenagers, and was a ratings hit, drawing in 2.3 million viewers per episode. Production was completed in 2002 after the show fulfilled its 65 episode order. The success of the television series led Disney Channel to produce a feature film spin-off based on the show, titled The Lizzie McGuire Movie. In 2019, it was announced that Lizzie McGuire would return for Disney+, with Hilary Duff, Hallie Todd, Robert Carradine, and Jake Thomas announcing that they would return to "Lizzie McGuire" to reprise their roles. The series was later cancelled in December 2020, after showrunner Minsky departed from her role.

The series stars Hilary Duff as Lizzie McGuire, who is an ordinary teenager dealing with issues confronted by adolescents in their daily life. A unique feature of the show is that her thoughts and emotions are expressed by her sarcastic animated alter ego. Lalaine and Adam Lamberg play the roles of Miranda and Gordo, who are Lizzie's best friends. Other co-stars include Jake Thomas, Hallie Todd and Robert Carradine as Matt, Jo and Sam McGuire respectively. On November 23, 2004, the first twenty-two episodes of the show were released in a DVD box set in the United States.

Since the episodes are shown according to their air date, and not the order in which they were filmed, which usually shows the chronology of the episodes, some continuity errors are presented throughout the series – for example "Pool Party", released as the fourth episode of the first season, was the very first episode filmed, and shows the animated Lizzie introducing the characters for the first time, and in the episode "Bye Bye Hillridge Junior High", the final episode produced, was aired in the middle of the second season; it shows Lizzie and her classmates graduating from middle school, giving way to the events of the movie. The series' production order most closely reflects the intended chronological episode order, aka the order in which the episodes were filmed. Lalaine's character Miranda did not appear in episodes with production codes 229-234, the last 6 episodes filmed for the show, since Lalaine left the show to work on the film You Wish! Lalaine was also absent in The Lizzie McGuire Movie which went to theatres in May 2003, in that time being because Lalaine was busy with Radio Disney Concert Tours.

Series overview

Episodes

Season 1 (2001–2002)

Season 2 (2002–2004)

Film (2003)

References

External links 
 

Episodes
Lists of American children's television series episodes
Lists of American sitcom episodes
Lists of Disney Channel television series episodes